Mingmu Dihuang Pills is a blackish-brown pill used in Traditional Chinese medicine to "nourish yin of the liver and the kidney, and to improve eyesight". Its odor is slightly aromatic. It tastes sweet, bitter and astringent. It is used where there is "deficiency of yin of the liver and the kidney marked by dryness of the eye, photophobia, blurred vision and lacrimination during exposure to the wind". The binding agent is honey.

Chinese classic herbal formula

See also
 Chinese classic herbal formula
 Bu Zhong Yi Qi Wan
 Chinese ophthalmology

References

Traditional Chinese medicine pills